General Sir William Eliot Peyton,  (7 May 1866 – 14 November 1931) was a British Army officer who served as Military Secretary to the British Expeditionary Force from 1916 to 1918. He was Delhi Herald of Arms Extraordinary at the time of the Delhi Durbar of 1911.

Early life
The third son of Colonel John Peyton, commanding officer of the 7th Dragoon Guards, Peyton was educated at Brighton College.

Military career
In 1885, Peyton enlisted in the ranks in the 7th Dragoon Guards, a regiment that his father had commanded between 1871 and 1876. The explanation of this was his failure to pass the entrance examination of the Royal Military College, Sandhurst. Having risen to sergeant, Peyton was commissioned as a second lieutenant in the 7th Dragoon Guards on 18 June 1887, and promoted lieutenant in 1890. He was appointed regimental adjutant in 1892. In 1896 he transferred to the 15th Hussars and was promoted captain.

He was seconded to the Egyptian Army and saw service with the Dongola Expeditionary Force in 1896, and was mentioned in despatches, then in the Sudan in 1897 and 1898, where he was dangerously wounded and his horse killed under him by a spear. In the Sudan he was again mentioned in despatches, and received the Distinguished Service Order. He was also awarded the Order of the Medjidieh, Fourth Class.

Peyton fought next in South Africa, 1899–1900, where he served with Alexander Thorneycroft's Mounted Infantry, was promoted major and brevet lieutenant colonel, again mentioned in despatches, and received the Queen's South Africa Medal with three clasps, but his service was cut short by illness and he was invalided back to England. He passed the Army's Staff College in December 1901.

From 1903 until 1907 Peyton commanded the 15th Hussars, being granted the brevet rank of colonel in 1905. In 1907 he went to India to become Assistant Quartermaster-General, India, and, as a temporary brigadier general, to command the Meerut Cavalry Brigade from 1908 to 1912. In India, he served as Delhi Herald of Arms Extraordinary at the Coronation Durbar held on 12 December 1911, and was made a Commander of the Royal Victorian Order, and from July 1912 was Military Secretary to the Commander-in-Chief, India.

Peyton returned to England in 1914 on the outbreak of the First World War and took up a new post as chief of staff of the 1st Mounted Division Territorial Force (TF). Promoted to major general in 1914 (first as temporary promotion, from October as substantive rank), he commanded the 2nd Mounted Division TF on the Gallipoli Peninsula, seeing action on 21 August 1915 and taking part in the final evacuation of 19 December 1915. The division suffered severe casualties at Suvla. Peyton then commanded the Western Frontier Force in Egypt in 1916, leading an expedition against the Senussi and re-occupying Sidi Barrani and Sollum, again being mentioned in despatches.

In May 1916, after success as a combat commander, Peyton was transferred to become Sir Douglas Haig's Military Secretary in Flanders, remaining with Haig until March 1918. The post was at the heart of the operation of the management of appointments, promotions, removals, honours and awards of the British Expeditionary Force (BEF). In December of the year he was granted the colonelcy of the 15th The King's Hussars, holding the position until their merger with the 19th Hussars in 1922 and thereafter the colonelcy of the combined 15th/19th Hussars until his death.

Peyton was knighted in 1917, being made a Knight Commander of the Royal Victorian Order when King George V visited the troops in the field.

In April and May 1918, Peyton nominally commanded the Reserve Army. Fifth Army had been defeated on the Somme in March 1918 and taken over by the Fourth Army, and the former Fifth Army staff formed a reserve HQ at Crécy-en-Ponthieu. On 23 May, the Fifth Army was reconstituted and given to Sir William Birdwood, and for six weeks (as a temporary lieutenant general) Peyton took command of X Corps, though his corps was held back from the fighting. However, from 3 July 1918 until March 1919 he returned to active service as commander of the 40th Infantry Division during operations in France and Flanders, leading it through the Hundred Days advance through Flanders.

Peyton's feelings about his postings between May 1916 and July 1918 were expressed silently by his omitting any mention of them from his entry in Who's Who.

Peyton next returned to India, to command the United Province district and the 3rd Indian Division at Meerut between 1920 and 1922. He was promoted substantive lieutenant general in 1921.

Peyton was next posted as Military Secretary to the Secretary of State for War, from 1922 to 1926, and as Commander-in-Chief of Scottish Command, 1926 to 1930. This was his last post before retirement in 1930; he had been promoted general in 1927.

A member of the Army and Navy Club, he died there suddenly on 14 November 1931. He is buried in Brompton Cemetery, London, just to the north-west of the chapel.

He was unusually tall, with a height of six feet, six inches.

Family
On 27 April 1889, Peyton married Mabel Maria, daughter of late Lt-General the Hon. E. T. Gage CB, third son of Henry Gage, 4th Viscount Gage, and of Ella Henrietta Maxse, a granddaughter of the 5th Earl of Berkeley. With Mabel, he had one daughter, Ela Violet Ethel. After his wife's death in 1901, Peyton remarried in 1903 with Gertrude, daughter of Major-General A. R. Lempriere and the widow of Captain Stuart Robertson of the 14th Hussars. They had one son and his second wife died in 1916.

In 1921, Peyton's daughter Ela married Lieutenant-Colonel Sir Edward Daymonde Stevenson KCVO (1895–1958) and she died in 1976, leaving one son. Peyton's son-in-law was Gentleman Usher of the Green Rod, 1953–1958, and Purse Bearer to the Lord High Commissioner to the General Assembly of the Church of Scotland, 1930–1958.

Freemasonry
He was Initiated in Lodge Logonier, No.2436, (England) and was made an Honorary Member of Lodge Holyrood House (St. Luke's), No.44, (Edinburgh) on 24 March 1923. He was the Grand Sword-bearer of the Grand Lodge of Scotland 1927–1928.

Honours
 Mentioned in Despatches, 1896, 1898, 1900, 1915, 1916
 Khedive's Medal with two clasps, 1896
 Distinguished Service Order, 1898
 Order of the Medjidieh, Fourth Class, conferred by the Khedive of Egypt with the authority of the Sultan of Turkey, 1899
 Queen's South Africa Medal with three clasps
 Commander of the Royal Victorian Order, 1911
 Commander of the Legion d'Honneur
 Companion of the Order of the Bath, 1913
 Order of the Nile, 2nd Class, 1916
 Commandeur de l'Ordre de Leopold, 1916
 Colonel of the 15th The King's Hussars, 10 December 1916
 Knight Commander of the Order of the Bath, 1917
 Knight Commander of the Royal Victorian Order, 1917
 Croix de Guerre (Belgium), 1918
 Colonel of the 15th/19th The King's Hussars, 1922
 Honorary Colonel of the Warwickshire Yeomanry, 17 February 1926

References

External links

 Portraits of General Sir William Eliot Peyton at npg.org.uk

|-

|-

|-

1866 births
1931 deaths
Military personnel of British India
British Army cavalry generals of World War I
British Army personnel of the Second Boer War
7th Dragoon Guards soldiers
7th Dragoon Guards officers
15th The King's Hussars officers
Knights Commander of the Order of the Bath
Knights Commander of the Royal Victorian Order
Companions of the Distinguished Service Order
English officers of arms
People educated at Brighton College
British Army generals
Burials at Brompton Cemetery
Recipients of the Order of the Medjidie, 4th class
British Army personnel of the Mahdist War
Recipients of the Croix de guerre (Belgium)
Graduates of the Staff College, Camberley